Noer may refer to:

People
 Arifin C. Noer (1941–1995), Indonesian poet, theater director and film producer
 Deliar Noer (1926–2008), Indonesian Muslim scholar, politician, and lecturer
 Eva Noer Kondrup (born 1964), Danish composer
 Jajang C. Noer (born 1952), Indonesian actress and film producer
 Michael Noer (director) (born 1978), Danish film director
 Michael Noer (editor) (born 1969), American business writer and editor
 Muhammad Noer (1918–2010), Indonesian politician
 Noer Alie
 Noer Muhammad Iskandar (1955–2020), Indonesian cleric
 Ragnhild Noer (born 1959), Norwegian judge

Places
 Noer, Schleswig-Holstein, Germany